The Southwest Coast National Scenic Area is a national scenic area in Taiwan.

The scenic area, which was set up in November 2003, covers parts of Tainan City, Chiayi County, and Yunlin County. It promotes tourist attractions on land and at sea between Taiwan Highway 17 in the east, and where the ocean reaches a depth of 20 meters.

It includes the main winter habitat of the black-faced spoonbill, an endangered waterbird.

In addition to ecological attractions, the scenic area has several remnants of Taiwan's now-defunct salt industry.

The administrative headquarters are in Beimen District, in Tainan City.

See also
 List of tourist attractions in Taiwan

References

External links
 Southwest Coast National Scenic Area (governmental site)

2003 establishments in Taiwan
National scenic areas of Taiwan